This is a complete list of astronauts in the United States Space Force. There have currently been two NASA astronauts who have been members of the U.S. Space Force. The first U.S. Space Force astronaut, Colonel Mike Hopkins, commemorated the service's first birthday by having his transfer ceremony on 19 December 2020 on the International Space Station.

List of astronauts

See also
NASA Astronaut Corps
List of United States Marine Corps astronauts

References

United States Space Force
United States Space Force lists